The Symphony No. 56 in C major, Hoboken I/56, is a symphony by Joseph Haydn, composed by 1774. It is scored for 2 oboes, bassoon, 2 horns (C alto and F), 2 trumpets, timpani and strings. It is in four movements:

Allegro di molto
Adagio
Menuet & trio
Finale: Prestissimo

Daniel Heartz has noted the similarity of the first movement in its character to the first movement of Haydn's Symphony No. 55.  The slow movement, in F, contains notable concertante work in the bassoon and two oboe parts.  The finale is a frenetic tarantella/saltarello dance movement with several pauses and fermatas as interruptions.

References

Sources
 Robbins Landon, H. C. (1963) Joseph Haydn:  Critical Edition of the Complete Symphonies, Universal Edition, Vienna.

Symphony 056
Compositions in C major
1774 compositions